The 2019 Kansas City Royals season was the 51st season for the franchise, and their 47th at Kauffman Stadium. They had a 1-game improvement from the previous season, but they were eliminated from postseason contention on August 27. The season was Ned Yost’s final season as manager as he announced on September 23 that he was retiring at the end of the season.

Season standings

American League Central

American League Wild Card

Record against opponents

Regular season

Game log

|-style=background:#bfb
||1|| March 28 ||White Sox || 5–3 || Keller (1–0) || Rodón (0–1) || Boxberger (1) || 31,675 || 1–0 || W1
|-style=background:#bfb
||2|| March 30 || White Sox || 8–6 || Junis (1–0) || López (0–1) || Kennedy (1) || 13,533 || 2–0 || W2 
|-style=background:#fbb
||3|| March 31 || White Sox || 3–6 || Giolito (1–0) || López (0–1) || Colomé (1) || 12,669 || 2–1 || L1 
|-style=background:#fbb
||4|| April 2 || Twins || 4–5 (10) || Hildenberger (1–0) || Boxberger (0–1) || Parker (1) || 10,024 || 2–2 || L2 
|-style=background:#fbb
||5|| April 3 || Twins || 6–7 || May (1–0) || Peralta (0–1) || Parker (2) || 10,575 || 2–3 || L3 
|-style=background:#fbb
||6|| April 4 || @ Tigers || 4–5 || Hardy (1–0) || Zimmer (0–1) || Greene (5) || 42,641 || 2–4 || L4 
|-style=background:#fbb
||7|| April 6 || @ Tigers || 4–7 || Alcántara (2–0) || McCarthy (0–1) || Greene (6) || 22,111 || 2–5 || L5
|-style=background:#fbb
||8|| April 7 || @ Tigers || 1–3 || Ross (1–1) || Keller (1–1) || Greene (7) || 15,058 || 2–6 || L6
|-style=background:#fbb
||9|| April 8 || Mariners || 5–13 || Elías (1–0) || Bailey (0–1) ||-|| 10,259 || 2–7 || L7
|-style=background:#fbb
||10|| April 9 || Mariners || 3–6 || Gonzales (4–0) || Junis (1–1) || Swarzak (2) || 10,366 || 2–8 || L8
|-style=background:#fbb
||11|| April 10 || Mariners || 5–6 || Swarzak (1–0) || Boxberger (0–2) || Elías (2) || 12,775 || 2–9 || L9 
|-style=background:#fbb
||12|| April 11 || Mariners || 6–7 (10) || Brennan (1–0) || Sparkman (0–1) || Sadzeck (1) || 10,231 || 2–10 || L10 
|-style=background:#bfb
||13|| April 12 || Indians || 8–1 || Keller (2–1) || Carrasco (1–2) ||-|| 11,950 || 3–10 || W1 
|-style=background:#bfb
||14|| April 13 || Indians || 3–0 || Bailey (1–1) || Rodríguez (0–1) || Peralta (1) || 15,188 || 4–10 || W2 
|-style=background:#bfb
||15|| April 14 || Indians || 9–8 || Peralta (1–1) || Hand (0–1) ||-|| 14,303 || 5–10 || W3 
|-style=background:#fbb
||16|| April 15 || @ White Sox || 4–5 || Bañuelos (1–0) || Boxberger (0–3) || Colomé (4) || 12,553 || 5–11 || L1
|-style=background:#fbb
||17|| April 16 || @ White Sox || 1–5 || López (1–2) || López (0–2) ||-|| 13,583 || 5–12 || L2
|-style=background:#bfb
||18|| April 17 || @ White Sox || 4–3(10) || Peralta (2–1) || Jones (0–1) || Barlow (1) || 14,358 || 6–12 || W1 
|-style=background:#bfb
||19|| April 18 || @ Yankees || 6–1 || Bailey (2–1) || Germán (3–1) ||-|| 39,106 || 7–12 || W2
|-style=background:#fbb
||20|| April 19 || @ Yankees || 2–6 || Sabathia (1–0) || Junis (1–2) ||-|| 39,668 || 7–13 || L1 
|-style=background:#fbb
||21|| April 20 || @ Yankees || 2–9 || Tanaka (2–1) || Fillmyer (0–1) ||-|| 42,013 || 7–14 || L2 
|-style=background:#fbb
||22|| April 21 || @ Yankees || 6–7(10) || Britton (1–0) || Diekman (0–1) ||-|| 40,523 || 7–15 || L3 
|-style=background:#fbb
||23|| April 22 || @ Rays || 3–6|| Font (1–0) || Keller (2–2) || Pagan (1) || 9,914 || 7–16 || L4
|-style=background:#fbb
||24|| April 23 || @ Rays || 2–5 || Beeks (1–0) || Bailey (2–2) || Pagan (2) || 8,298 || 7–17 || L5 
|-style=background:#bfb
||25|| April 24 || @ Rays || 10–2 || Junis (2–2) || Snell (2–2) ||-|| 9,502 || 8–17 || W1 
|-style=background:#fbb
||26|| April 26 || Angels || 1–5 || Skaggs (2–2) || Duffy (0–1) ||-|| 23,186 || 8–18 || L1 
|-style=background:#bfb
||27|| April 27 || Angels || 9–4 || Barlow (1–0) || Barría (2–2) ||-|| 18,755 || 9–18 || W1
|-style=background:#fbb
||28|| April 28 || Angels || 3–7 || Harvey (1–2) || Bailey (2–3) ||-|| 21,549 || 9–19 || L1 
|-style=background:#fbb
||29|| April 29 || Rays || 5–8 || Chirinos (4–0) || Keller (2–3) ||-|| 11,744 ||  9–20 || L2 
|-style=background:#bbb
||—|| April 30 || Rays || colspan=7|Postponed (Rain); Makeup: May 1 
|-

|-style=background:#bfb
||30|| May 1 || Rays || 3–2 || Junis (3–2) || Stanek (0–1) || Kennedy (2) || - || 10–20 || W1 
|-style=background:#bfb
||31|| May 1 || Rays || 8–2 || Sparkman (1–1) || Snell (2–3) ||-|| 11,411 || 11–20 || W2 
|-style=background:#fbb
||32|| May 2 || Rays || 1–3 || Kolarek (2–0) || Peralta (2–2) || Castillo (4) || 23,343 || 11–21 || L1 
|-style=background:#fbb
||33|| May 3 || @ Tigers || 3–4 || Boyd (3–2) || López (0–3) || Greene (13) || 14,020 || 11–22 || L2 
|-style=background:#bfb
||34|| May 4 || @ Tigers || 15–3 || Bailey (3–3) || Ross (1–4) ||-|| 19,500 || 12–22 ||  W1 
|-style=background:#fbb
||35|| May 5 || @ Tigers || 2–5 (10) || Farmer (2–2) || Kennedy (0–1) ||-|| 16,369 || 12–23 || L1 
|-style=background:#fbb
||36|| May 6 || @ Astros || 4–6 || Cole (3–4) || Junis (3–3) || Osuna (8) || 27,079 || 12–24 || L2 
|-style=background:#bfb
||37|| May 7 || @ Astros || 12–2 || Duffy (1–1) || McHugh (3–4) ||-|| 30,377 || 13–24 || W1 
|-style=background:#fbb
||38|| May 8 || @ Astros || 0–9 || Peacock (3–2) || López (0–4) ||-|| 22,698 || 13–25 || L1 
|-style=background:#bfb
||39|| May 10 || Phillies || 5–1|| Bailey (4–3) || Arrieta (4–3) ||-|| 20,015 || 14–25 || W1
|-style=background:#fbb
||40|| May 11 || Phillies || 0–7 || Eflin (5–3) || Keller (2–4) ||-|| 24,463 || 14–26 || L1
|-style=background:#fbb
||41|| May 12 || Phillies || 1–6 || Irvin (1–0) || Junis (3–4) ||-|| 19,640 || 14–27 || L2 
|-style=background:#bfb
||42|| May 14 || Rangers || 11–5 || Duffy (2–1) || Miller (1–3) ||-|| 19,410 || 15–27 || W1
|-style=background:#fbb
||43|| May 15 || Rangers || 1–6 || Minor (4–3) || López (0–5) ||-|| 14,572 || 15–28 || L1
|-style=background:#fbb
||44|| May 16 || Rangers || 1–16 || Lynn (5–3) || Bailey (4–4) ||-|| 17,469 || 15–29 || L2
|-style=background:#fbb
||45|| May 17 || @ Angels || 2–5 || Harvey (2–3) || Keller (2–5) || Robles (5) || 43,444 || 15–30 || L3
|-style=background:#fbb
||46|| May 18 || @ Angels || 3–6 || Canning (2–1) || Junis (3–5) || Buttrey (2) || 43,415 || 15–31 || L4
|-style=background:#bfb
||47|| May 19 || @ Angels || 5–1 || Duffy (3–1) || Skaggs (4–4) ||-|| 43,329 || 16–31 || W1
|-style=background:#bbb
||48|| May 21 || @ Cardinals || colspan=8|Postponed (rain); Makeup:May 22
|-style=background:#bfb
||48|| May 22 || @ Cardinals || 8–2 || Keller (3–5) || Wacha (3–2) ||-|| 42,275 || 17–31 || W2
|-style=background:#fbb
||49|| May 22 || @ Cardinals || 3–10 || Wainwright (4–4) || Bailey (4–5) ||-|| 42,529 || 17–32 || L1
|-style=background:#bbb
||50|| May 24 || Yankees || colspan=8|Postponed (rain); Makeup:May25
|-style=background:#fbb
||50|| May 25 || Yankees || 3–7 || Happ (4–3) || Barlow (1–1) ||-|| 25,243 || 17–33 || L2
|-style=background:#fbb
||51|| May 25 || Yankees || 5–6 || Adams (1–0) || López (0–6) || Chapman (14) || 18,599 || 17–34 || L3
|-style=background:#bfb
||52|| May 26 || Yankees || 8–7 (10) || McCarthy (1–1) || Holder (3–2) || — || 21,499 || 18–34 || W1
|-style=background:#bbb 
||53|| May 27 || @ White Sox || colspan=8|Suspended (inclement weather); Continuation scheduled for May 28
|-style=background:#fbb
||53|| May 28 || @ White Sox || 1–2 || Colomé (2–0) || Diekman (0–2) || — || 13,842 || 18–35 || L1
|-style=background:#fbb
||54|| May 28 || @ White Sox || 3–4 || Giolito (7–1) || Keller (3–6) || Colomé (10) || 13,842 || 18–36 || L2
|-style=background:#fbb
||55|| May 29 || @ White Sox || 7–8 || Herrera (2–3) || Kennedy (0–2) || Colomé (11) || 16,167 || 18–37 || L3
|-style=background:#bfb
||56|| May 30 || @ Rangers || 4–2 || Junis (4–5) || Minor (5–4) || Kennedy (3) || 26,202 || 19–37 || W1 
|-style=background:#fbb
||57|| May 31 || @ Rangers || 2–6 || Jurado (2–2) || Duffy (3–2) ||-|| 31,183 || 19–38 || L1
|-

|-style=background:#fbb
||58|| June 1 || @ Rangers || 2–6 || Lynn (7–4) || Bailey (4–6) ||-|| 27,133 || 19–39 || L2
|-style=background:#fbb
||59|| June 2 || @ Rangers || 1–5 || Sampson (4–3) || Keller (3–7) ||-|| 21,891 || 19–40 || L3
|-style=background:#fbb
||60|| June 4 || Red Sox || 3–8 || Rodríguez (6–3) || Barlow (1–2) ||-|| 13,184 || 19–41 || L4
|-style=background:#fbb
||61|| June 5 || Red Sox || 0–8 || Sale (2–7) || Junis (4–6) ||-|| 15,523 || 19–42 || L5
|-style=background:#fbb
||62|| June 6 || Red Sox || 5–7 || Brewer (1–2) || Duffy (3–3) || Barnes (4) || 19,928 || 19–43 || L6
|-style=background:#bfb
||63|| June 7 || White Sox || 6–4 || Boxberger (1–3) || Fry (1–2) || Kennedy (4) || 24,744 || 20–43 || W1
|-style=background:#fbb
||64|| June 8 || White Sox || 0–2 || Giolito (9–1) || Keller (3–8) || Colomé (13) || 20,889 || 20–44 || L1
|-style=background:#fbb
||65|| June 9 || White Sox || 2–5 || López (4–6) || Sparkman (1–2) ||-|| 22,501 || 20–45 || L2
|-style=background:#bfb
||66|| June 11 || Tigers || 3–2 || Barlow (2–2) || Alcántara (2–1) || Kennedy (5) || 20,776 || 21–45|| W1
|-style=background:#fbb
||67|| June 12 || Tigers || 2–3 || Ramirez (3–0) || Diekman (0–3) || Greene (20) || 19,870 || 21–46|| L1
|-style=background:#bfb
||68|| June 13 || Tigers (Game played in Omaha) || 7–3 || Bailey (5–6) || Boyd (5–5) || Kennedy (6) || 25,454 || 22–46 || W1
|-style=background:#fbb
||69|| June 14 || @ Twins || 0–2 || Gibson (7–3) || Diekman (0–4) || Rogers (7) || 38,898 || 22–47 || L1
|-style=background:#fbb
||70|| June 15 || @ Twins || 4–5 || Odorizzi (10–2) || Sparkman (1–3) || Rogers (8) || 39,267 || 22–48 || L2
|-style=background:#bfb
||71|| June 16 || @ Twins || 8–6 || López (1–6) || Pérez (7–3) || Kennedy (7) || 38,886 || 23–48|| W1
|-style=background:#bfb
||72|| June 17 || @ Mariners || 6–4 || Flynn (1–0) || Bass (1–2) || Kennedy (8) || 14,476 || 24–48 || W2
|-style=background:#bfb
||73|| June 18 || @ Mariners || 9–0 || Bailey (6–6) || Kikuchi (3–5) ||-|| 12,697 || 25–48 || W3
|-style=background:#fbb
||74|| June 19 || @ Mariners || 8–2 || Gonzales (8–6) || Keller (3–9) ||-|| 16,228 || 25–49|| L1
|-style=background:#bfb
||75|| June 20 || Twins || 4–1 || Sparkman (2–3) || Odorizzi (10–3) || Kennedy (9) || 22,683 || 26–49 || W1
|-style=background:#fbb
||76|| June 21 || Twins || 7–8 || Harper (3–0) || Diekman (0–5) || Rogers (9) || 27,418 || 26–50 || L1
|-style=background:#fbb
||77|| June 22 || Twins || 3–5  || May (2–1) || Peralta (2–3) || Parker (10) || 28,504 || 26–51 || L2
|-style=background:#bfb
||78|| June 23 || Twins || 6–1 || Bailey (7–6) || Pineda (4–4) || McCarthy (1) || 21,257 || 27–51 || W1
|-style=background:#fbb
||79|| June 24 || @ Indians || 2–3 || Hand (4–2) || Peralta (2–4) ||-|| 15,413 || 27–52 || L1
|-style=background:#bfb
||80|| June 25 || @ Indians || 8–6 || McCarthy (2–1) || Hand (4–3) || Kennedy (10) || 21,766 || 28–52 || W1
|-style=background:#fbb
||81|| June 26 || @ Indians || 3–5 || Bauer (6–6) || Junis (4–7) ||-|| 22,246 || 28–53 || L1
|-style=background:#fbb
||82|| June 28 || @ Blue Jays || 2–6 || Hudson (4–2) || Duffy (3–4) ||-|| 18,399 || 28–54 || L2
|-style=background:#fbb
||83|| June 29 || @ Blue Jays || 5–7 || Hudson (5–2) || Barlow (2–3) ||-|| 24,906 || 28–55 || L3
|-style=background:#bfb
||84|| June 30 || @ Blue Jays || 7–6 || Keller (4–9) || Sanchez (3–11) || Kennedy (11) || 21,727 || 29–55 || W1
|-

|-style=background:#fbb
||85|| July 1 || @Blue Jays || 3–11 || Richard (1–4) || Sparkman (2–4) ||-|| 29,339 || 29–56 || L1
|-style=background:#fbb
||86|| July 2 || Indians || 5–9 || Bauer (7–6) || Junis (4–8) ||-|| 18,934 || 29–57 || L2
|-style=background:#fbb
||87|| July 3 || Indians || 0–4 || Clevinger (2–2) || Duffy (3–5) ||-|| 25,049 || 29–58 || L3
|-style=background:#fbb
||88|| July 4 || Indians || 4–8 || Cimber (4–2) || López (1–7) ||-|| 18,076 || 29–59 || L4
|-style=background:#bfb
||89|| July 5 || @Nationals || 7–4 (11) || Flynn (2–0) || Venters (0–1) || Peralta (2) || 25,213 || 30–59 || W1
|-style=background:#fbb
||90|| July 6 || @Nationals || 0–6 || Scherzer (9–5) || Sparkman (2–5) ||-|| 27,863 || 30–60 || L1
|-style=background:#fbb
||91|| July 7 || @Nationals || 2–5 || Doolittle (6–2) || Diekman (0–6) ||-|| 21,873 || 30–61 || L2
|-style=background:#bbbfff
|colspan="10"|90th All-Star Game in Cleveland, OH
|-style=background:#bfb
||92|| July 12 || Tigers || 8–5 || Newberry (1–0) || Hardy (1–1) || Kennedy (12) || 25,059 || 31–61 || W1
|-style=background:#bfb
||93|| July 13 || Tigers || 4–1 || Keller (5–9) || Boyd (6–7) || Kennedy (13) || 27,551 || 32–61 || W2
|-style=background:#fbb
||94|| July 14 || Tigers || 8–12 || Ramirez (4–3) || Flynn (2–1) || — || 13,763 || 32–62 || L1
|-style=background:#bfb
||95|| July 15 || White Sox || 5–2 || Junis (5–8) || Giolito (11–4) || Kennedy (14) || 16,006 || 33–62 || W1
|-style=background:#bfb
||96|| July 16 || White Sox || 11–0 || Sparkman (3–5) || Cease (1–1) ||-|| 16,557 || 34–62 || W2
|-style=background:#bfb
||97|| July 17 || White Sox || 7–5 || Duffy (4–5) || Nova (4–9) || Kennedy (15) || 14,340 || 35–62 || W3
|-style=background:#bfb
||98|| July 18 || White Sox || 6–5 || Keller (6–9) || Detwiler (1–1) || Kennedy (16) || 13,157 || 36–62 || W4
|-style=background:#fbb
||99|| July 19 || @ Indians || 5–10 || Bieber (9–3) || Montgomery (1–3) ||-|| 26,640 || 36–63 || L1
|-style=background:#bfb
||100|| July 20 || @ Indians || 1–0 || Junis (6–8) || Plutko (3–2) || Kennedy (17) || 31,958 || 37–63 || W1
|-style=background:#fbb
||101|| July 21 || @ Indians || 4–5 || Plesac (4–3) || Sparkman (3–6) || Hand (27) || 23,564 || 37–64 || L1
|-style=background:#bfb
||102|| July 23 || @ Braves || 5–4 || Hill (1–0) || Swarzak (2–3) || Kennedy (18) || 36,570 || 38–64 || W1
|-style=background:#bfb
||103|| July 24 || @ Braves || 2–0 || Keller (7–9) || Teherán (5–7) || Kennedy (19) || 38,865 || 39–64 || W2
|-style=background:#fbb
||104|| July 25 || Indians || 4–5  || Goody (2–0) || Flynn (2–2) || Cole (1) || 15,224 || 39–65 || L1
|-style=background:#fbb
||105|| July 26 || Indians || 3–8 || Plesac (5–3) || Junis (6–9) ||-||  26,609 || 39–66 || L2
|-style=background:#fbb
||106|| July 27 || Indians || 1–9 || Clevinger (5–2) || Sparkman (3–7) ||-|| 31,181 || 39–67 || L3
|-style=background:#bfb
||107|| July 28 || Indians || 9–6 || Duffy (5–5) || Bauer (9–8) || Kennedy (20) || 14,380 || 40–67 || W1
|-style=background:#fbb
||108|| July 29 || Blue Jays || 3–7 || Mayza (1–1) || Keller (7–10) ||-|| 18,306 || 40–68 || L1
|-style=background:#fbb
||109|| July 30 || Blue Jays || 2–9 || Reid-Foley (1–1) || Montgomery (1–4) ||-|| 18,379 || 40–69 || L2
|-style=background:#fbb
||110|| July 31 || Blue Jays || 1–4 || Waguespack (2–1) || Junis (6–10) || Shafer (1) || 14,480 || 40–70 || L3
|-

|-style=background:#fbb
||111|| August 2 || @ Twins || 9–11 || May (4–3) || Lovelady (0–1) || Romo (18) || 32,341 || 40–71 || L4
|-style=background:#fbb
||112|| August 3 || @ Twins || 3–11 || Gibson (11–4) || Duffy (5–6) ||-|| 36,823 || 40–72 || L5
|-style=background:#fbb
||113|| August 4 || @ Twins || 0–3 || Smeltzer (1–1) || Keller (7–11) || Rogers (17) || 30,171 || 40–73 || L6
|-style=background:#fbb
||114|| August 5 || @ Red Sox || 5–7 || Porcello (10–8) || Montgomery (1–5) || Workman (6) || 33,636 || 40–74 || L7
|-style=background:#bfb
||115|| August 6 || @ Red Sox || 6–2 || Junis (7–10) || Cashner (10–7) ||-|| 36,360 || 41–74 || W1
|-style=background:#bbb
||—|| August 7 || @ Red Sox || colspan=8|Suspended (rain). Score 4–4, top of 10th. To be resumed on August 22.
|-style=background:#fbb
||116|| August 8 || @ Tigers || 8–10 || Jiménez (3–6) || Lovelady (0–2) ||-|| 17,197 || 41–75 || L1
|-style=background:#fbb
||117|| August 9 || @ Tigers || 2–5 || Jackson (2–5) || Keller (7–12) || Jiménez (1) || 21,475 || 41–76 || L2
|-style=background:#bfb
||118|| August 10 || @ Tigers || 7–0 || Montgomery (2–5) || Turnbull (3–10) ||-|| 26,028 || 42–76 || W1
|-style=background:#bfb
||119|| August 11 || @ Tigers || 10–2 || Junis (8–10) || Norris (3–10) ||-|| 19,790 || 43–76 || W2
|-style=background:#fbb
||120|| August 13 || Cardinals || 0–2 || Flaherty (6–6) || Sparkman (3–8) || Martínez (13) || 23,563 || 43–77 || L1
|-style=background:#fbb
||121|| August 14 || Cardinals || 0–6 || Hudson (11–6) || Keller (7–13) ||-|| 22,494 || 43–78 || L2
|-style=background:#bfb
||122|| August 16 || Mets || 4–1 || Montgomery (3–5) || Syndergaard (8–6) || Kennedy (21) || 21,439 || 44–78 || W1
|-style=background:#fbb
||123|| August 17 || Mets || 1–4 || deGrom (8–7) || Junis (8–11) || Lugo (3) || 28,697 || 44–79 || L1
|-style=background:#fbb
||124|| August 18 || Mets || 5–11 || Familia (4–1) || McCarthy (2–2) ||-|| 20,661 || 44–80 || L2
|-style=background:#bfb
||125|| August 19 || @ Orioles || 5–4 || López (2–7) || Means (8–9) || Kennedy (22) || 11,659 || 45–80 || W1
|-style=background:#fbb
||126|| August 20 || @ Orioles || 1–4 || Harvey (1–0) || Barnes (1–2) || Givens (10) || 11,826 || 45–81 || L1
|-style=background:#fbb
||127|| August 21 || @ Orioles || 1–8 || Brooks (3–7) || Montgomery (3–6) ||-|| 9,872 || 45–82 || L2
|-style=background:#fbb
||128|| August 22 || @ Red Sox || 4–5 (10) || Taylor (1–1) || Lovelady (0–3) ||-|| 32,453 || 45–83 || L3
|-style=background:#fbb
||129|| August 23 || @ Indians || 1–4 || Plesac (7–4) || Junis (8–12) || Hand (30) || 31,946 || 45–84 || L4
|-style=background:#fbb
||130|| August 24 || @ Indians || 2–4 || Clevinger (9–2) || Sparkman (3–9) || Hand (31) || 33,349 || 45–85 || L5
|-style=background:#bfb
||131|| August 25 || @ Indians || 9–8  || Kennedy (1–2) || Goody (3–1) || López (1) || 29,360 || 46–85 || W1
|-style=background:#fbb
||132|| August 26 || A's || 4–19 || Bailey (12–8) || Keller (7–14) ||-|| 13,595 || 46–86 || L1
|-style=background:#fbb
||133|| August 27 || A's || 1–2 || Fiers (13–3) || Montgomery (3–7) || Hendriks (16) || 13,669 || 46–87 || L2
|-style=background:#bfb
||134|| August 28 || A's || 6–4 || Hill (2–0) || Treinen (6–5) || Kennedy (23) || 15,049 || 47–87 || W1
|-style=background:#fbb
||135|| August 29 || A's || 8–9 || Petit (4–3) || Sparkman (3–10) || Hendriks (17) || 13,844 || 47–88 || W2
|-style=background:#fbb
||136|| August 30 || Orioles || 2–14 || Means (10–9) || Skoglund (0–1) ||-|| 16,287 || 47–89 || L1
|-style=background:#bfb
||137|| August 31 || Orioles || 7–5 || Barlow (3–3) || Fry (1–6) || Kennedy (24) || 18,385 || 48–89 || W1
|-

|-style=background:#bfb
||138|| September 1 || Orioles || 6–4 || McCarthy (3–2) || Fry (1–7) || Kennedy (25) || 18,208 || 49–89 || W2
|-style=background:#bfb
||139|| September 3 || Tigers || 6–5 || Kennedy (2–2) || Reininger (0–1) ||-|| 12,644 || 50–89 || W3
|-style=background:#bfb
||140|| September 4 || Tigers || 5–4 || Junis (9–12) || Jackson (3–9) || Kennedy (26) || 15,308 || 51–89 || W4
|-style=background:#fbb
||141|| September 5 || Tigers || 4–6 || Boyd (8–10) || Sparkman (3–11) || Jiménez (5) || 14,736 || 51–90 || L1
|-style=background:#bfb
||142|| September 6 || @ Marlins || 3–0 || López (3–7) || López (5–7) || Kennedy (27) || 8,915 || 52–90 || W1
|-style=background:#bfb
||143|| September 7 || @ Marlins || 7–2 || Duffy (6–6) || Conley (2–8) || Hill (1) || 13,112 || 53–90 || W2
|-style=background:#fbb
||144|| September 8 || @ Marlins || 0–9 || Alcántara (5–12) || Montgomery (3–8) ||-|| 10,934 || 53–91 || L1
|-style=background:#fbb
||145|| September 10 || @ White Sox || 3–7 || Nova (10–12) || Junis (9–13) ||-|| 15,196 || 53–92 || L2
|-style=background:#bfb
||146|| September 11 || @ White Sox || 8–6 || Sparkman (4–11) || López (9–13) || Kennedy (28) || 14,385 || 54–92 || W1
|-style=background:#bfb
||147|| September 12 || @ White Sox || 6–3 || López (4–7) || Giolito (14–9) || Kennedy (29) || 13,838 || 55–92 || W2
|-style=background:#fbb
||148|| September 13 || Astros || 1–4 || Cole (17–5) || Fillmyer (0–2) || Osuna (33) || 20,593 || 55–93 || L1
|-style=background:#fbb
||149|| September 14 || Astros || 1–6 || Greinke (16–5) || Montgomery (3–9) ||-|| 20,716 || 55–94 || L2
|-style=background:#fbb
||150|| September 15 || Astros || 3–12 || Miley (14–5) || Junis (9–14) ||-|| 17,205 || 55–95 || L3
|-style=background:#bfb
||151|| September 16 || @ A's || 6–5 || McCarthy (4–2) || Hendriks (4–3) || Kennedy (30) || 12,902 || 56–95 || W1
|-style=background:#fbb
||152|| September 17 || @ A's || 1–2 || Puk (2–0) || López (4–8) || Hendriks (23) || 14,992 || 56–96 || L1
|-style=background:#fbb
||153|| September 18 || @ A's || 0–1  || Wendelken (3–1) || Hahn (0–1) ||-|| 16,714 || 56–97 || L2
|-style=background:#fbb
||154|| September 19 || @ Twins || 5–8 || Thorpe (3–2) || Barnes (1–3) || Rogers (28) || 24,565 || 56–98 || L3
|-style=background:#fbb
||155|| September 20 || @ Twins || 3–4 || Dobnak (1–1) || Skoglund (0–2) || May (2) || 29,468 || 56–99 || L4
|-style=background:#bfb
||156|| September 21 || @ Twins || 12–5 || Rosario (2–0) || Rogers (2–4) ||-|| 37,750 || 57–99 || W1
|-style=background:#fbb
||157|| September 22 || @ Twins || 8–12 || Littell (6–0) || López (4–9) ||-|| 31,628 || 57–100 || L1
|-style=background:#bfb
||158|| September 24 || Braves || 9–6 || Duffy (7–6) || Teherán (10–11) ||-|| 16,688 || 58–100 || W1
|-style=background:#fbb
||159|| September 25 || Braves || 2–10 || Jackson (9–2) || Barnes (1–4) ||-|| 16,931 || 58–101 || L1
|-style=background:#fbb
||160|| September 27 || Twins || 2–6  || Berríos (14–8) || Skoglund (0–3) ||-|| 15,389 || 58–102 || L2
|-style=background:#fbb
||161|| September 28 || Twins || 3–4 || Duffey (5–1) || Barnes (1–5) || Rogers (30) || 21,995 || 58–103 || L3
|-style=background:#bfb
||162|| September 29 || Twins || 5–4 || Kennedy (3–2) || Graterol (1–1) ||-|| 17,875 || 59–103 || W1
|-

|- style="text-align:center;"
| Legend:       = Win       = Loss       = PostponementBold = Royals team member

Roster

Farm system

References

External links
Kansas City Royals Official Site 
2019 Kansas City Royals at Baseball Reference

Kansas City Royals
Kansas City Royals seasons
Kansas City Royals